Visitors to Nauru must obtain a visa unless they come from one of the countries eligible for free visa on arrival. All visitors must hold a passport valid for 3 months. Transit visas are not required if  the connecting flight leaves within three hours of arrival in Nauru. Business visitors must have a local sponsor.

Visa applications are made by emailing the Nauru Immigration with necessary details.

Visa map

Visa on arrival
Nationals of the following 14(+2) countries may obtain a free visa on arrival

An agreement between Nauru and South Ossetia on mutual visa-free trips for 90 days within any 180 day period was signed on 3 February 2018 and is yet to be ratified.

Simplified visa procedure
Nationals of the following 66 countries are issued visas under a simplified procedure.

Unlike other visitors, they do not have to submit a criminal record certificate and a certificate of medical fitness together with a visa application

Journalist visas
In early 2014 it was decided that journalists reporting on Nauru detention centre will be charged AUD 8000 for a three-month visa.

See also

Visa requirements for Nauruan citizens

References

External links
Nauru visa application form

Nauru
Foreign relations of Nauru